Jazzmeia Horn (born April 16, 1991) is an American jazz singer and songwriter. She won the Thelonious Monk Institute International Jazz Competition in 2015.  
Horn's repertoire includes jazz standards and covers of songs from other genres, including by artists such as Stevie Wonder.
She has been compared to jazz vocalists such as Betty Carter, Sarah Vaughan, and Nancy Wilson.

Early life
Horn was born and raised in Dallas, Texas, United States. She attended the Booker T. Washington High School for the Performing and Visual Arts in Dallas.

Music career
Horn moved to New York City in 2009. She attended the New School for Jazz and Contemporary Music. During her first semester in New York City, she formed a trio featuring Javier Santiago, Nadav Lachishe, and Cory Cox.

Her first live radio show was in the fall of 2009 on the Junior Mance WBGO radio show in Newark, New Jersey, and she has performed at The Apollo, Ginny's Supper Club, and the Metropolitan Room.  Horn has since received many accolades from jazz critics.

In 2014, Horn toured internationally in England, France, Russia, South Africa, and Austria.

She was featured as one of the stars in South Australia's Generations in Jazz 2017, singing with artists such as James Morrison, Wycliffe Gordon, Gordon Goodwin and Ross Irwin among others.

In 2017 Horn also released her first album. Entitled A Social Call, it was ranked the number 1 album for 2017 on the JazzWeek website.  The album tour took her throughout the U.S., Asia (Macau), and Europe (London, Paris, and Milan).

A Social Call earned Horn her first Grammy nomination in 2018. She performed at the 60th Grammy Award Ceremony on January 28, 2018, and was met with much admiration from the audience.

Her follow-up album, Love & Liberation, earned Horn her second Grammy nomination in 2020 for best jazz vocal album.

Discography
 A Social Call (2017), Prestige Records
 Love & Liberation (2019), Concord Jazz
 Dear Love with Her Noble Force (2021), Empress Legacy Records

Awards
2008, 2009 – Downbeat Student Music Award's Recipient
2010 – Downbeat Vocal Jazz Soloist Winner   
2012 – Winner of the Sarah Vaughan International Jazz Vocal Competition, Rising Star award
2013 – Winner of the Sarah Vaughan International Jazz Vocal Competition
2015 – Winner of the Thelonious Monk Institute International Jazz Competition
2018 – DownBeat, Rising Star Female Vocalist Winner

References

External links 

 Official website

Living people
American women jazz singers
American jazz singers
21st-century African-American women singers
1991 births
21st-century American singers
21st-century American women singers
Musicians from Dallas